Ajab Singh Kushwah is an Indian politician from Madhya Pradesh. He is the Indian National Congress MLA of Sumawali state Assembly constituency.

Political Career
He was elected as an MLA for the first time in 2020 by-elections.

References

Living people
Indian National Congress politicians from Madhya Pradesh
Year of birth missing (living people)
Madhya Pradesh MLAs 2018–2023